Martin Neil Huxley (born in 1944) is a British mathematician, working in the field of analytic number theory.

He was awarded a PhD from the University of Cambridge in 1970, the year after his supervisor Harold Davenport had died. He is a professor at Cardiff University.

Huxley proved a result on gaps between prime numbers, namely that if pn denotes the n-th prime number and if θ  > 7/12, then

for all sufficiently large n.

Huxley also improved the known bound on the Dirichlet divisor problem.

References

External links

Living people
21st-century British mathematicians
20th-century British mathematicians
Number theorists
Academics of Cardiff University
Alumni of the University of Cambridge
1944 births